Blessed George Napier Roman Catholic School, known locally as BGN, is a Roman Catholic secondary school and sixth form with academy status. It is located on Addison Road in the Easington ward of Banbury, Oxfordshire, England.

Foundation
The school is named "Blessed George Napier" after George Napper (Napier), who is the patron of the school, and there are memorial plaques on the outside of the school, depicting his death. BGN is one of only two Catholic schools offering secondary education in Oxfordshire, the other one being Greyfriars Catholic School in Oxford. Previously a voluntary aided school administered by Oxfordshire County Council and Roman Catholic Archdiocese of Birmingham, Blessed George Napier Roman Catholic School converted to academy status on 1 August 2014. However the school continues to coordinate with Oxfordshire County Council for admissions.

Facilities
The school has two main buildings (with a third building under construction as of October 2021), one of which is named the Corrigan building after Monsignor Corrigan, two outbuildings, including a Sports Centre, an Astroturf court at the rear and an on-site Chapel, with stained glass windows depicting the life and death of the School's Patron, Blessed George Napier, as well as two Portakabins as classrooms. The Sports Centre is named the "Monsy" after Monsignor Corrigan, a fairly well-known and long-serving Chair of Governors now deceased. The school has 870 students in the 11–18 age range, including a sixth form. In the past, BGN has won awards for its school meals catering. It also has a youth choir, who still fundraise at local supermarkets during the Christmas period and go on trips to other countries. There will soon be a third additional building coming in late september 2022.

External links
School website

Secondary schools in Oxfordshire
Catholic secondary schools in the Archdiocese of Birmingham
Academies in Oxfordshire